River of Death is a 1989 American action film written and directed  by Steve Carver and starring Michael Dudikoff. It is based on the 1981 novel of the same name by  Alistair MacLean.

Plot 
In the nightmarish last days of the Third Reich, a psychotic Nazi scientist (Robert Vaughn) escapes to the impenetrable jungles of the Amazon. Years later, a mysterious incurable disease breaks out among the natives and adventurer John Hamilton (Michael Dudikoff) is hired to lead investigators on a search for the cause. Braving bloodthirsty river pirates, hostile native tribes and headhunting cannibals, Hamilton, guides a group of explorers up the deadly Rio del Morte to the fabulous lost Inca city.

Production 
According to director Steve Carver, the movie was originally to be shot in Brazil. But this turned out too expensive. South Africa's Port St. Johns was then chosen as a location which, according to Carver was "dangerous as all hell". "We were lucky no one got killed."

Carver enjoyed working with actors Herbert Lom, Robert Vaughn and Donald Pleasence: "These guys were professionals. They would carry the equipment up the mountainside with the crew. Fantastic actors. You would tell them something, give them changes in dialogue and – boom! – they know it in seconds. You never have problems with these actors."

River of Death was shot during the cultural boycott, which resulted in director Steve Carver being fined by the Directors Guild of America. Carver remained unapologetic in 2020: "I had ignored the apartheid, because I am not political. I couldn’t give a damn about their apartheid at that time."

Cast
 Michael Dudikoff as John Hamilton
 Robert Vaughn as Wolfgang Manteuffel    
 Donald Pleasence as Heinrich Spaatz    
 Herbert Lom as Colonel Ricardo Diaz    
 L. Q. Jones as Hiller    
 Sarah Maur Thorp as Anna Blakesley    
 Cynthia Erland as Maria
 Gordon Mulholland as Fanjul
 Ian Yule as John "Long John" Silver

Reception
The Los Angeles Times said "this hapless movie's strategy seems to be to squeeze Alistair MacLean's story lugubriously through the send-up style of "Raiders of the Lost Ark" and hope the jungle scenery and desultory hamminess of Pleasence and Herbert Lom (as another villain) will distract the audience from everything else. It doesn't work."

References

External links 

1989 action films
1989 films
American action films
Films directed by Steve Carver
Films based on British novels
Films based on works by Alistair MacLean
Films about Nazi hunters
Films shot in South Africa
Films about Nazi fugitives in South America
1980s American films